Auxiliadora is a Spanish and Portuguese female name. It refers to Mary Help of Christians. It can also refer to:

People
María Auxiliadora Delgado, First Lady of Uruguay
Auxiliadora Jiménez, Spanish footballer
Geography
Auxiliadora, Rio Grande do Sul, a neighbourhood of Porto Alegre, Rio Grande do Sul, Brazil
María Auxiliadora, Distrito Nacional, a neighbourhood of Santo Domingo, Dominican Republic
María Auxiliadora, Guanajuato, a town in Guanajuato, Mexico
Churches
María Auxiliadora, Montevideo, a Roman Catholic church in the neighbourhood of Parque Rodó, Montevideo, Uruguay
María Auxiliadora, Colón, Montevideo, a Roman Catholic church in the neighbourhood of Villa Colón, Montevideo, Uruguay
Schools
Colegio María Auxiliadora, a school in Carolina, Puerto Rico
Liceo María Auxiliadora, a high school in Santa Cruz, Colchagua Province, Chile